The siege of Damascus (also known as the Sack of Damascus and the Capture of Damascus) was a major event in 1400 during the war between the Timurid Empire and Mamluk Egypt.

Background
Timur was one of the most powerful Central Asian rulers since Genghis Khan. By long and relentless fighting, he sought to rebuild the Mongol Empire of his predecessors.

Prior to attacking Syrian cities, Timur had initially sent an ambassador to Damascus who was executed by the city's Mamluk viceroy, Sudun. In 1400, he started a war with the Mamluk sultan of Egypt Nasir-ad-Din Faraj and invaded Mamluk Syria. Timur's forces took Aleppo in November 1400. He massacred many of the inhabitants, ordering the building of a tower of 20,000 skulls outside the city. After taking Aleppo, Timur continued his advance where he took Hama, along with nearby Homs and Baalbek, and besieged Damascus.

Battle

An army led by the Mamluk Sultan Nasir-ad-Din Faraj was defeated by Timur outside Damascus leaving the city at the mercy of the Mongol besiegers. With his army defeated, the Mamluk sultan dispatched a deputation from Cairo, including Ibn Khaldun, who negotiated with him, but after their withdrawal he put the city to sack.

One particularly distressing incident, verified by independent eyewitnesses, was the burning of the famous Umayyad Mosque and many others. Noted imams and religious priests went to Timur and asked for his mercy in the name of Allah. He falsely assured them to take shelter in mosques with their women and children. When thus they totalled more than 30,000 people; he got the doors locked and burnt them alive.

Aftermath

After the capture of Damascus, Timur's Neo Mongol empire now bordered another emerging power in the region, the Ottoman Empire. The two powers soon came into direct conflict. Bayezid demanded tribute from one of the Anatolian Beyliks who had pledged loyalty to Timur and threatened to invade. Timur interpreted this action as an insult to himself and in 1400 sacked the Ottoman city of Sebaste (modern Sivas). Timur would later go on to defeat the Ottoman Sultan Bayezid at the Battle of Ankara.

References

Bibliography
.

Conflicts in 1400
Damascus 1400
Medieval Damascus
Damascus 1400
1400 in Asia
Sieges of Damascus
Damascus 1400
1400s in the Middle East